Friederike Mayröcker (20 December 1924 – 4 June 2021) was an Austrian writer of poetry and prose, audio plays, children's books and dramatic texts. She experimented with language, and was regarded as an avantgarde poet, and as one of the leading authors in German. Her work, inspired by art, music, literature and  everyday life, appeared as "novel and also dense text formations, often described as 'magical'." According to The New York Times, her work was "formally inventive, much of it exploiting the imaginative potential of language to capture the minutiae of daily life, the natural world, love and grief".

Life 
Mayröcker was born in Vienna, the daughter of a teacher and a milliner. Until age 11, she spent the summers regularly in the village Deinzendorf. In World War II, she was drafted as an air force aide, working as a secretary. From 1946 to 1969 Mayröcker was an English teacher at several public schools in Vienna.

She started writing poetry at age 15. In 1946, she met Otto Basil who published some of her first works in his avant-garde journal . Mayröcker's poems were published a few years later by renowned literary critic Hans Weigel. She was eventually introduced to the Wiener Gruppe, a group of mostly surrealist and expressionist Austrian authors such as Ingeborg Bachmann. Her first book, a collection of prose miniatures, Larifari – Ein konfuses Buch (Airy-fairy. A confused book), appeared in 1956. It remained the only book for ten years, but then the poem collection Death by Muses, meant her breakthrough and recognition as "a leading lyrical voice of her generation". Many more collections followed, published from 1979 by Suhrkamp.

Mayröcker is recognized as one of the most important contemporary Austrian poets. She also had success with her prose and radio plays. Four of them she wrote together with Ernst Jandl, her partner from 1954 until his death in 2000. While they shared a love of writing, they did not share a house or have any children. She once reflected in a poem that they stood together in the kitchen with poems in their heads, "but not the same one". Even so, after Jandl's death, she was so stricken with grief that she was initially unable to write. She eventually addressed this grief in her work, Requiem for Ernst Jandl, and resumed writing well into her nineties. Her prose is often described as autofictional, since Mayröcker uses quotes of private conversations and excerpts from letters and diaries in her work. She described her working process:
"I live in pictures. I see everything in pictures, my complete past, memories are pictures. I transform pictures into language by climbing into the picture. I walk into it until it becomes language."

She sometimes included her drawings in books, and exhibited her art. She was also inspired by music, and literature of Samuel Beckett and Friedrich Hölderlin, among many others. Her montages are also fed from everyday life observations, correspondence and newspapers. She produced "novel and also dense text formations, often described as "magical".

Mayröcker earned numerous German-language literary prizes and was frequently mentioned as a potential Nobel laureate.

A German-produced documentary chronicling Mayröcker's life and work was released in 2008. Her last lyric collection, da ich morgens und moosgrün. Ans Fenster trete (as mornings and mossgreen I. Step to the window), was short-listed for the prize of the Leipzig Book Fair 2021, with the jury saying that she "fuses poetry and prose into 'proems' full of infatuations, futilities, fantasies, daydreams".

She saw life, "like a surprise - you never know how it ends, it's an adventure that you create yourself".

Mayröcker died on 4 June 2021, in Vienna, aged 96.

Selected works 
Source:
 Gesammelte Prosa 1949–2001 (Collected Prose 1949–2001) ed. by Klaus Reichert, 5 volumes, Frankfurt/Main 2001 
 Magische Blätter I-V (Magic Pages I–V), Frankfurt/Main 2001 
 Requiem für Ernst Jandl (Requiem for Ernst Jandl), Frankfurt/Main 2001 
 Mein Arbeitstirol – Gedichte 1996–2001 (My Working Tyrol – Poems 1996–2001), Frankfurt/Main 2003 
 Die kommunizierenden Gefäße (The Communicating Vessels) Frankfurt/Main 2003 
 Sinclair Sofokles der Baby-Saurier (Sinclair Sofokles the Baby Dinosaur) with coloured illustrations by Angelika Kaufmann, St. Pölten 2004 
 Gesammelte Gedichte 1939–2003 (Collected Poems) ed. by Marcel Beyer, Frankfurt/Main 2005 
 Und ich schüttelte einen Liebling (And I Shook a Darling), Frankfurt/Main 2005 
 fleurs, Suhrkamp, Berlin 2016, 
 Pathos und Schwalbe, Suhrkamp, Berlin 2018,

Audio plays 
Audio plays by Mayröcker, some written jointly with Jandl, include:

 Die Umarmung, nach Picasso (The Embrace, After Picasso)
 Repetitionen, nach Max Ernst (Repetitions, After Max Ernst)
 Schubertnotizen oder das unbestechliche Muster der Ekstase (Schubert-Notes or the Incorrupt Model of Ecstasy)
 Arie auf tönernen Füßen (Aria on Feet of Clay)
 Das zu Sehende, das zu Hörende (The to Be Seen, the to Be Heard) (awarded the ORF radio play prize)
 Die Kantate oder, Gottes Augenstern bist Du (The Cantata or, Gods Eye-star You Are), music by Wolfgang von Schweinitz (2003)
with Ernst Jandl:
 Der Gigant (The Giant)
 Gemeinsame Kindheit (Childhood Together)
 Fünf Mann Menschen, translated as Five Man Humanity 
 Spaltungen (Partitions)

Libretto 
 Stretta, music by Wolfram Wagner. World premiere at Sirene Opera, Vienna 2004

Translations 
Several of Mayröcker’s collections have been translated into English, including Night Train (1992, trans. Beth Bjorklund); Heiligenanstalt (1994, trans. Rosmarie Waldrop); with each clouded peak (1998, trans. Rosmarie Waldrop and Harriett Watts); peck me up, my wing (2000, trans. Mary Burns); Raving Language: Selected Poems 1946–2006 (2007, trans. Richard Dove); and brütt, or The Sighing Gardens (2008, trans. Roslyn Theobald).

Awards 

 1963: Theodor Körner Prize
 1969: Hörspielpreis der Kriegsblinden for Fünf Mann Menschen (with Ernst Jandl)
 1975: Austrian Prize for Literature
 1976: 
 1977: 
 1981: Anton Wildgans Prize
 1982: Grand Austrian State Prize for Literature
 1982: Roswitha Prize
 1985: Literature Prize of Southwest Radio Baden-Baden
 1985: Gold Medal of Vienna
 1987: Austrian Decoration for Science and Art
 1989: Hans-Erich-Nossack-Preis
 1993: Friedrich-Hölderlin-Preis of Bad Homburg
 1994: Manuscripts Award
 1996: Else Lasker-Schüler Poetry Prize
 1996: Grand Literature Prize of the Bavarian Academy of Fine Arts
 1997: America Award
 1997: Droste-Preis (Meersburg)
 2000: Christian-Wagner-Preis
 2001: Karl Sczuka Prize for the radio play The envelope of the birds
 2001: Georg Büchner Prize
 2001: Honorary doctorate, University of Bielefeld
 2003: Premio Internazionale
 2004: Honorary Ring of the Vienna
 2009: Hermann-Lenz-Preis for poem Scardanelli
 2010: Peter-Huchel-Preis for This jacket (namely) the griffin
 2010: Horst-Bienek-Preis für Lyrik of the Bavarian Academy of Fine Arts
 2011: Bremen Literature Prize for ich bin in der Anstalt. Fusznoten zu einem nichtgeschriebenen Werk
 2016: 
 2017: 
 2017: Hörbuch des Jahres

References

Citations

Bibliography 
 Theo Breuer: „Friederike Mayröcker, usw.“, in: T.B., Aus dem Hinterland. Lyrik nach 2000, Edition YE, Sistig/Eifel 2005
 Renate Kühn (Ed.): Friederike Mayröcker oder Das innere des Sehens, studies about poetry, radio play and prose, Bielefeld 2002
 Inge Arteel / Heidy M. Müller (Ed.): Rupfen in fremden Gärten – Intertextualität im Schreiben Friederike Mayröckers, Bielefeld 2002
 Edith A. Kunz: Verwandlungen – Zur Poetologie des Übergangs in der späten Prosa Friederike Mayröckers, Göttingen 2004
 Ralf B. Korte / Elisabeth Hödl: FM dj (reading reise durch die nacht). Ein elektronischer Briefroman.  2004
 Martin A. Hainz: Schwarze Milch zu schreiben. Paul Celan und Friederike Mayröcker. In: Weimarer Beiträge, No. 52·1, 2006, pp. 5–19
 Leo Truchlar: Wozu lese und schreibe ich? Notizen aus Anlaß meiner Lektüren von Adrienne Rich und Friederike Mayröcker. – In: Leo Truchlar, Über Literatur und andere Künste, Wien 2000, p. 17ff.
 Inge Arteel: „gefaltet, entfaltet“. Strategien der Subjektwerdung in Friederike Mayröckers Prosa 1988–1998. Bielefeld 2007.

External links 

 Friederike Mayröcker poetryfoundation.org
 Collection of links at the Free University of Berlin 
 
 was brauchst du (poem and biography, in German) lyrikline.org
Sound recordings  with Friederike Mayröcker in the Online Archive of the Österreichische Mediathek (Literary readings) 

1924 births
2021 deaths
Austrian women poets
Writers from Vienna
Anton Wildgans Prize winners
Georg Büchner Prize winners
Recipients of the Austrian Decoration for Science and Art
Recipients of the Grand Austrian State Prize
Members of the Academy of Arts, Berlin
German-language poets